François Marcantoni (28 May 1920 in Alzi, Corsica – 17 August 2010 in Paris) was a Corsican gangster and member of French resistance.

World War II
In 1942, during World War II, Marcantoni participated in a sabotage operation in Toulon. He refused to collaborate with the regime of Vichy France. In the 1950s, he was involved in a series of bank robberies.

Markovic affair
Marcantoni was under investigation in 1968 for the killing of Stevan Marković, a bodyguard for the film star Alain Delon. One of the factors pointing in his direction was a letter Markovic sent to his brother Aleksandar wherein he wrote: "If I get killed, it's 100% the fault of Alain Delon and his godfather François Marcantoni". Marcantoni spent 11 months in custody but was released in December 1969 because the prosecutor could not prove his guilt.

Writer
Marcantoni wrote two books:
Markovic affair - 1976
Who killed Markovic? - 1985

Death
He died on 17 August 2010, aged 90 in Paris.

References

External links
François Marcantoni

1920 births
2010 deaths
Corsican Resistance members
French gangsters
French bank robbers
20th-century French non-fiction writers
French crime bosses
Place of death missing
20th-century French male writers